The 2nd arrondissement of Parakou is an arrondissement in the Borgou Department of Benin. It is an administrative division under the jurisdiction of the commune of Parakou. According to the population census conducted by the Institut National de la Statistique Benin on February 15, 2002, the arrondissement had a total population of 45,765.

References

Arrondissements of Benin